Imogen Sutton is a Canadian–British producer and director and widow of animator Richard Williams. She is best known for producing the animated short film Prologue, that earned her a nomination for the Academy Award for Best Animated Short Film with Williams.

Filmography

 Art Babbitt
 The Thief and the Cobbler
 Prologue
 Circus Drawings
 The Animator's Survival Kit
 The Princess and the Cobbler

Awards
 2016: Academy Award for Best Animated Short Film  Nominated  
 2016: BAFTA Award for Best Short Animation  Nominated

References

External links

Year of birth missing (living people)
Living people
British animated film producers
Canadian animated film producers
British film producers
Canadian emigrants to England
Canadian expatriates in England
Canadian women film producers